Gary Caos (real name Gherardo Casini) is an Italian DJ, producer and radio speaker. He is known for several top chart house music productions that topped the Beatport charts. He produced songs with and for international artists such as Pitbull, In-Grid, Leandro Da Silva (with the release "Cafè" out for Spinnin' Records) and also produced the official remix of the classic "Hit The Road Jack" by Ray Charles. He also collaborated with fellow Italian DJ Glovibes, titled "Watch Out". He is set to feature in the Miami Music Week 2017 event "House Stars" on 22 March 2017.

In 2018 he joined Peter Kharma's side projects Slicerboys and Italian Disco Mafia with the Italian singer Antonio Mezzancella. In his career he produced more than 200 tracks for the labels: Armada, Ultra, Ministry Of Sound, Universal, StreetKing, HedKandi, EGO, Time Records, Warner Music.

He is the founder of the record label "Casa Rossa" (founded in 2009).

Discography

Releases

Charted singles

References 

Italian DJs
Italian electronic musicians
Deep house musicians
Living people
Electronic dance music DJs
Year of birth missing (living people)